Jane I. Guyer (born 31 December 1943) is the George Armstrong Kelly Professor in the Department of Anthropology at Johns Hopkins University.

Biography
Before coming to Hopkins, Guyer taught at Northwestern University, Harvard University, and Boston University. She has published extensively on economic development in West Africa, on the productive economy, the division of labor, and the management of money. She was elected to the National Academy of Sciences in 2008 and serves on several international and national committees, including the International Advisory Group to the World Bank and the governments of Chad and Cameroon on the Chad–Cameroon Petroleum Development and Pipeline Project, the Lost Crops of Africa panel published by the National Academy, and the Board and Executive Committee of the African Studies Association. Her research has been celebrated for her contributions not just to empirical research but theoretical discourse on several topics.

Education
Guyer was born in Scotland and attended the London School of Economics, earning a bachelor's degree in sociology in 1965. She then attended the University of Rochester, where the department focused on the British social anthropological tradition, and studied under Robert Merrill and Alfred Harris. She completed her graduate training in 1972. Her dissertation was titled The Organizational Plan of Traditional Farming: Idere, Western Nigeria. Guyer earned her first teaching position at the University of North Carolina before she had completed her studies.

Major works

Publications
 Family and Farm in Southern Cameroon, 1984. Boston University, African Studies Center. Research Study #15.
 Feeding African Cities: Essays in Regional Social History (editor), 1987. Edinburgh University Press and the International African Institute.
 An African Niche Economy, 1997. Edinburgh University Press and the International African Institute.
 Time and African Land Use: Ethnography and Remote Sensing. 2007. Guyer and  Eric Lambin (eds.) Special issue of Human Ecology, vol. 35, no. 1.
 Money Matters: Instability, Values and Social Payments in the Modern History of West African Communities (editor), 1995. Heinemann.
 Money Struggles and City Life (co-editor with LaRay Denzer and Adigun Agbaje), 2002. Heinemann.
 Marginal Gains: Monetary Transactions in Atlantic Africa, 2004. University of Chicago Press.
 Cultures of Monetarism. Collected papers and abstracts

Exhibits
 To Dance the Spirit: Masks of Liberia, 1986. Peabody Museum of Archaeology and Ethnology, Harvard University.
 Living Tradition in Africa and the Americas: The Legacy of Melville J. &  Frances  S. Herskovits, 1998. Mary and Leigh Block Museum of Art, Northwestern University.

References

External links
 Gupta, Sujata. "Profile of Jane Guyer". Proceedings of the National Academy of Sciences, February 14, 2012 vol. 109 no. 7, pp. 2181–2183. 
 Biography at Johns Hopkins University
 A special issue of African Studies Review devoted to Marginal Gains

1943 births
Living people
Scottish anthropologists
Scottish women anthropologists
Members of the United States National Academy of Sciences
Johns Hopkins University faculty
Northwestern University faculty
Harvard University faculty
Boston University faculty
Alumni of the London School of Economics
University of Rochester alumni